The Government of Nepal exercises its executive authority through a number of government ministries. The ministries are headed by a cabinet minister, who sits in the Council of Ministers, and is sometimes supported by a state minister .

Federal government 
This is a comprehensive list of all federal ministries of Nepal. The full list of ministries and minister under the Third Dahal cabinet is given below.

Provincial government 

The ministries of provinces in Nepal are as follows.

Koshi Province

Madhesh Province

Bagmati Province

Gandaki Province

Lumbini Province

Karnali Province

Sudurpashchim Province

See also 

 List of Nepal government organizations

References

Government of Nepal
 
Nepal
M